On 1 January 2015, Boko Haram, an Islamic Jihadist and terrorist organization based in northeast Nigeria kidnapped about 40 boys and young men from the village of Malari in Borno State, Nigeria. The victims were taken into a nearby forest.

See also
Slavery in 21st century Islamism

References

Boko Haram kidnappings
Kidnapped Nigerian children
Kidnappings in Nigeria
Child abduction in Nigeria
Slavery in Nigeria
Terrorist incidents in Nigeria in 2015
Kidnappings by Islamists
Crime in Borno State
January 2015 events in Nigeria
Violence against men in Africa
Mass kidnappings of the 2010s
Terrorist incidents in Borno State
Incidents of violence against boys